The Brunstkopf is a mountain immediately north of Zirl in the Karwendel Alps in the Austrian state of Tyrol. It is 1,719 metres high.

Ascent 
There are unmarked routes from the direction of the Garberskopf (1,903 m) along the arete to the northeast; and from the ridge to the south-southwest between the Lackental and Grabental re-entrants, the path branching off the mountain road (closed to private vehicles) above Hochzirl.

References 

Mountains of Tyrol (state)
Mountains of the Alps